Sergey Rikhter (born 23 April 1989) is a USSR-born Israeli Olympic sport shooter.

He shares the junior world record in the 10 metre air rifle, and was the 2009 ISSF World Cup champion.  He competed on behalf of Israel at the 2012 Summer Olympics, and for Israel at the 2016 Summer Olympics. He won the gold medal in the 2013 European Championship and was named European Champion at 10 m. He won a bronze medal at the 2015 European Games for Israel, and the gold medal at the 2019 European Games for Israel in the Men's 10m Air Rifle.

Early life
Rikhter was born on 23 April 1989, in the Ukrainian SSR of the Soviet Union, and now lives in Rehovot, Israel. He is Jewish and an Israeli citizen.  Rikhter attended Wizo High School, in Rehovot.

Shooting career

He began shooting in 2002, at 13 years of age, as part of a Gadna (Israel Defense Forces youth corps) program. He then trained with Hapoel Rehovot.

Rikhter trains at the Herzliya firing range, and is now a member of Maccabi Ra'anana.  He is right-handed, and his "master eye" is his right eye.  He is coached by Israeli three-time Olympian Guy Starik and Evgeny Aleynikov. His club is Maccabi Ra'anana Shooting Club.

2003-12; Early years
Rikhter won a gold medal at 20 years of age at the 10 metre air rifle men's final of the 2009 ISSF World Cup in Munich, Germany.  His qualification score of 599 points was one point short of the world record, and tied the junior world record.  He won with 701.7 points.  Rikhter said after the match: “This is exciting, I did not expect to finish on the highest step of the podium.  This is my fourth time in an international competition!” He was signed to the German shooting team Kolber that same year.

In February 2010, he won the gold medal in the IWK Air Gun competition men's 10 metre air rifle match in Munich.  In June 2010, he came in fourth in the men's 10 metre air rifle final at the 2010 International Shooting Sport Federation (ISSF) World Cup in Belgrade, Serbia, missing the bronze medal by one-tenth of a point.  In June 2011, he was ranked fifth in the world by the ISSF.

He competed in the September 2011 ISSF World Cup final in the men's 10 metre air rifle. He received a two-point deduction for being late to the final, which moved him down from second and a silver medal, to seventh place. He won a silver medal at the 2011 Changwon, South Korea, World Cup, with 597 points, becoming the first Israeli athlete to qualify for the London Olympics.

In April 2012, he won the silver medal in the 2012 Shooting World Cup in London, in men's 10 metre air rifle.  His 701.1 points were a personal record.

Rikhter competed on behalf of Israel at the 2012 Summer Olympics in London in men's 10 metre air rifle, having qualified by earning a quota place. He missed the finals by one point, coming in 9th out of 30 competitors, with 8 shooters making it into the final.  After the Olympics, he planned to complete his military service, and to study graphic design.

2013-18; European champion
In March 2013, he won a gold medal in the European Championship in Odense, Denmark, and was named European Champion at 10 m. In April 2013, he won a silver medal at a 2013 World Cup tournament in Changwon, South Korea. In 2013 and 2014 he also won bronze medals at World Cup tournaments in Fort Benning, Georgia.

On 16 June 2015, he took the bronze medal at the 2015 European Games for Israel in the Men's 10m Air Rifle.

He competed for Israel at the 2016 Summer Olympics, coming in 14th out of 30 competitors in the Men's 10-meter air rifle competition with a score of 623.28 points, and coming in 15th out of 30 competitors with a score of 622.6 in the Men's 50m rifle prone competition.

2019-present; European champion
On 24 June 2019, he took the gold medal at the 2019 European Games for Israel in the Men's 10m Air Rifle.

2023; Withdrawal from competition
In 2023, Rikhter withdrew from international competition in Jakarta after the ISSF refused to allow him to compete with any symbols representing Israel. In order to qualify for the 2024 Olympic Games in Paris, athletes are required to compete in a series of four World Cup meets, of which Jakarta is the first in this cycle. Reportedly, World Cup organizers informed Richter and the Israeli federation they would only allow him to participate with his weapon if he competes with identification symbols of the ISSF or the flag of the International Olympic Committee. Richter rebuffed the ISSF and chose not to compete in the World Cup, in part stating, 

I will never accept to participate in a competition without the [IOC Country Code] ISR on my competition suit, on my personal rifle and on the results screen…I start the most important year on the way to Paris, when my opponents take a professional advantage over me due to political problems. If the Olympic movement, which advocates the existence of sports without distinctions of nationality, religion, race and sex, does not support its ideology, then what is its value? I don't understand how the state is allowed to organize some sort of competition with a national identity restriction.

Current world record in 10 m air rifle

See also
List of select Jewish shooters

References

External links

 
 
 
 

1989 births
Living people
Israeli male sport shooters
Jewish sport shooters
Israeli Jews
People from Rehovot
Ukrainian Jews
Israeli people of Ukrainian-Jewish descent
Ukrainian emigrants to Israel
Olympic shooters of Israel
Shooters at the 2012 Summer Olympics
Shooters at the 2016 Summer Olympics
Shooters at the 2015 European Games
European Games bronze medalists for Israel
European Games medalists in shooting
Shooters at the 2019 European Games
European Games gold medalists for Israel
Shooters at the 2020 Summer Olympics